Spy Time is a 2015 Spanish Eurospy action comedy film directed by Javier Ruiz Caldera based on the characters from the comic book series of the same name created by Manuel Vázquez Gallego. It stars Imanol Arias as the title character.

Plot
Former secret agent Anacleto (Imanol Arias) comes out of retirement when his arch-enemy Vázquez (Carlos Areces) escapes from prison and promptly targets Anacleto's son Adolfo (Quim Gutiérrez), who accidentally discovers his father's double identity and finds himself forced to co-operate with him to survive Vázquez's quest for revenge while trying to win back the heart of his ex-girlfriend Katia (Alexandra Jiménez).

Cast
Imanol Arias as Anacleto
Quim Gutiérrez as Adolfo
Carlos Areces as Vázquez
Alexandra Jiménez as Katia
Rossy de Palma as Katia's mother
Emilio Gutiérrez Caba as Anacleto's boss
Berto Romero as Martín
Eduardo Gómez as Mac "El Molécula"

Awards and nominations

See also 
 List of Spanish films of 2015

References

External links
 

2015 films
Spanish spy comedy films
2010s spy comedy films
2015 action comedy films
Spanish action comedy films
Films based on Spanish comics
Live-action films based on comics
2015 comedy films
2010s Spanish-language films
2010s Spanish films